Value Alliance is an airline alliance formed in May 2016. It is the world's second alliance (after the U-FLY Alliance) to consist only of low-cost carriers (LCCs). However, it is the first pan-regional LCC alliance. It comprises five (originally nine) Asia-Pacific airlines: Cebu Pacific, Cebgo, Jeju Air, Nok Air and Scoot.

Value Alliance is the fourth-largest airline alliance in terms of passengers, flights, destinations, combined fleet and members, ahead of U-FLY Alliance and Vanilla Alliance.

History 
The Value Alliance was established by eight airlines in the Asia-Pacific region on 16 May 2016. The alliance allows passengers to book flights with all of the eight carriers through each partner website, to create itineraries across the region through a single booking. The combined carriers collectively serve more than 160 destinations, primarily in the Asia-Pacific region, with a total fleet of 176 aircraft and an annual passenger total of 47 million in 2015.

Member airlines

Current members

, the following airlines are members of Value Alliance:

Former members

References

External links 

 

 
Airline alliances
Organizations established in 2016